Arifi is a surname. Notable people with the surname include:
Parwana Arifi (born 1991), Kabul Afghanistan Para powerlifting athlete.
Ahmed Arifi Pasha (1819 or 1830–1895/96), Ottoman statesman
Doni Arifi (born 2002), Finnish footballer
Mohamad al-Arifi (born  1970), Saudi author and scholar
Shpejtim Arifi (born 1979), Kosovar Albanian footballer
Teuta Arifi (born 1969), Macedonian Politician

See also
Schistura arifi, is a species of ray-finned fish in the stone loach